WC or wc may refer to:

 Water closet or flush toilet

Arts and entertainment 
 W.C. (film), an Irish feature film
 WC (band), a Polish punk rock band
 WC (rapper), a rapper from Los Angeles, California
 Westside Connection, former hip-hop supergroup from Los Angeles, California

Businesses and brands 
 Dodge WC series, a range of light military trucks produced by Dodge during World War II
 Allis-Chalmers Model WC, a row crop tractor
 Avianca Honduras (IATA code since 1985), an airline based in La Ceiba, Honduras
 Wien Air Alaska (IATA code until 1984), a defunct airline
 Weather Central, a provider of broadcast and interactive web weather solutions
 Wilson Combat, an American firearms manufacturer
 Wisconsin Central (disambiguation), various railroads
 Wheatland County, Alberta a municipality in south-central Alberta, Canada

Economics and finance 
 Workers' compensation, a form of insurance for work-related illness and injury
 Working capital, a financial metric
 Working class
 World-Check, financial institution risk mitigation database

Science and technology

Computing 
 wc (Unix), a Unix utility used for counting words and lines in a file 
 Web Components, a set of features that allow for the creation of reusable widgets or components in web documents and web applications
 Write combining, a computing performance method of combining multiple memory writes before sending them

Other uses in science and technology 
 Wall cloud, compounded area of a thunderstorm at the updraft-downdraft interchange where tornadoes may form
 Water cooler, a device that cools and dispenses water
 WC, the chemical formula for tungsten carbide, a metallic compound with a high boiling point
 WC or wc, a short form for inches water column, a unit of measure of pressure often used in HVAC contexts
 Weil–Châtelet group, in mathematics

Sport 
 Wild card (sports), a tournament or playoff berth awarded to an individual or team that has not qualified through normal play
 World Cup, a type of global sporting competition

Other uses 
 WC postcode area, a group of postcode districts in central London, England
 Wellington College (disambiguation), one of several academic institutions
 Wikimedia Commons, an online collaborative project of the Wikimedia Foundation
 Writing Commons, a peer-reviewed open education textbook for college-level writers